Magshimim (lit. Dream fulfillers) is a moshav in central Israel. Located near Yehud, it falls under the jurisdiction of Drom HaSharon Regional Council.

History
During the 18th and 19th centuries, the area of Magshimim belonged to the Nahiyeh (sub-district) of Lod that encompassed the area of the present-day city of Modi'in-Maccabim-Re'ut in the south to the present-day city of El'ad in the north, and from the foothills in the east, through the Lod Valley to the outskirts of Jaffa in the west. This area was home to thousands of inhabitants in about 20 villages, who had at their disposal tens of thousands of hectares of prime agricultural land.

The moshav was founded in 1949 by demobilised IDF soldiers on land that had previously belonged to the Palestinian village of Al-'Abbasiyya, which was depopulated in the 1948 Arab–Israeli War. They were later joined by immigrants from Germany, Iraq and Poland.

Economy
Amongst other things, the moshav's economy is built on flower exports and manufacturing printers.

Notable residents 

Ben Zhairi, footballer 
Liroy Zhairi, footballer

References

Moshavim
Populated places established in 1949 
Agricultural Union
Populated places in Central District (Israel)
1949 establishments in Israel
Iraqi-Jewish culture in Israel
German-Jewish culture in Israel
Polish-Jewish culture in Israel